was a Japanese athlete. He competed in the men's high jump at the 1936 Summer Olympics.

References

1914 births
2008 deaths
Place of birth missing
Japanese male high jumpers
Olympic male high jumpers
Olympic athletes of Japan
Athletes (track and field) at the 1936 Summer Olympics
Japan Championships in Athletics winners
20th-century Japanese people
21st-century Japanese people